Acosta is an unincorporated community in Somerset County, Pennsylvania, United States. Acosta has a post office, with ZIP code 15520, which opened on January 28, 1909.

References

Unincorporated communities in Somerset County, Pennsylvania
Unincorporated communities in Pennsylvania